Lee Selby (born 14 February 1987) is a retired Welsh former professional boxing world champion who competed from 2008 to 2022. He held the IBF featherweight title from 2015 to 2018, and previously the British, Commonwealth, and European featherweight titles between 2011 and 2014.

Professional career

Early career
Selby began his professional career on 12 July 2008 with a win over Sid Razak (3-8) at the Newport Leisure Centre in Wales. He compiled a record of 4-0 before losing for the first time in his professional career to Samir Mouneimne (1-0-1) by points decision in a four-round contest at the Fenton Manor Sports Complex in Stoke on 29 May 2009. Selby won his next three fights before beating Dai Davies (6-13-1) for the Welsh Area title on 30 October 2010 claiming the belt with a second-round knockout. On 30 July 2011, he met Scotsman James Ancliff (11-14-2) for the vacant Celtic featherweight title and claimed the belt with a sixth-round stoppage.

British and Commonwealth champion
On 17 September 2011, Selby claimed the British and Commonwealth titles with a win over then champion Stephen Smith via an eighth-round stoppage at the Olympia in Liverpool. Despite being the underdog going into the fight Selby took control of the centre of the ring and caught Smith with a left hand in the 8th round, a punch from which Smith was unable to recover. Selby said after the fight that the win "feels like I've won a world title" adding "It's something that I have been dreaming about since I was a kid. It's a big achievement and not a lot of people have done it".

On 20 April 2013 Selby dismantled the former unbeaten Australian champion Corey McConnell. McConell's corner threw in the towel in the fifth round.

WBC International Championship

Selby vs. Simion

On 13 July 2013, Lee Selby took another step towards a world title shot when he faced in Hull the unbeaten Romanian boxer and ranked at fourth by the WBC, Viorel Simion, and won the WBC International featherweight title with a unanimous decision victory. According to some prominent boxing writers, the British rising star passed the toughest test of his career in a very close fight.

IBF featherweight champion

Selby vs. Gradovich
In May 2015, Lee Selby won the IBF featherweight title from Evgeny Gradovich. The fight ended in a unanimous TD after Gradovich was cut from an accidental head clash, and was unable to continue.

Selby vs. Montiel
Selby retained his IBF featherweight title in October 2015 with a win over Mexican Fernando Montiel in Arizona. He dedicated the win to his childhood friend Darren Bray, who had recently died.

Selby vs. Barros
In July 2017, Lee made his next defence of his IBF featherweight crown. Just weeks before the fight, Selby received shocking news of his mother's sudden death in Wales, and his family urged him to pull out of the fight. Selby decided to continue training days later, and dedicate the fight to his mother.

Selby vs Warrington 
On 19 May 2018, Selby defended his IBF featherweight title for the fifth time, against unbeaten Josh Warrington. Warrington was the aggressor early in the fight, and managed to rock Selby with a left hook in the second round and a jab to the temple. Selby suffered a bad cut over his left eye in the sixth round, but was allowed to continue the fight. Warrington managed to be busier than Selby and landed cleaner shots through most of the fight. Selby lost the belt to Warrington via split decision, 113–115, 116-112 and 115-113 for Warrington.

Selby vs Douglas 
After losing his IBF belt, Selby bounced back with a victory over Omar Douglas. In a bloody fight, Selby managed to outbox Doulgas, to get the unanimous decision victory.

Selby vs Burns 
In his next fight, Selby faced former world champion Ricky Burns. In a very close and foul-filled fight, Selby managed to win on two of the scorecards, 116-112 and 116–113, while the third judge had it a draw, 115-115.

Selby vs. Kambosos Jr.
Selby was scheduled to face George Kambosos Jr. in Cardiff on 9 May 2020. but was postponed due to the COVID-19 pandemic. The fight eventually went ahead on 31 October at The SSE Arena in London, where Selby went the distance but lost by split decision.

Selby announced his retirement from boxing on 5 April 2022.

Professional boxing record

Personal life
Selby is the brother of GB Boxing's 2012 Olympic flyweight representative Andrew Selby.

See also 

 List of Welsh boxing world champions

References

External links

Lee Selby - Profile, News Archive & Current Rankings at Box.Live

Welsh male boxers
Living people
1987 births
Sportspeople from Barry, Vale of Glamorgan
European Boxing Union champions
International Boxing Federation champions
Commonwealth Boxing Council champions
World featherweight boxing champions
British Boxing Board of Control champions